Cherry Capital Airport  is a public use airport located  southeast of the central business district of Traverse City in Grand Traverse County, Michigan, United States. It is owned by Grand Traverse and Leelanau counties.

It is included in the Federal Aviation Administration (FAA) National Plan of Integrated Airport Systems for 2017–2021, in which it is categorized as a non-hub primary commercial service facility.

History
Cherry Capital Airport was opened in 1936 as Traverse City Airport, replacing Ransom Field. The airport was moved onto the Coast Guard Air Station, which had opened in 1946. The airport opened with four runways, all but one of which have been replaced. Remnants of the former runways exist to this day, with some being left abandoned and privately owned.

In the fall of 2004, Cherry Capital opened a new terminal on the south side of the east-west runway, demolishing the old one on the north side. This project also reconfigured the runways, marking the removal of the third diagonal runway. Since then, Cherry Capital Airport has continued to grow with various carriers adding seasonal service and destinations.

Cherry Capital Airport was the recipient of the 2003–04, 2004–05, and 2005–06 Balchen/Post Awards for outstanding achievement in snow and ice control in the small commercial service airport category. Soon, the airport will implement the first biometric access systems in the country. The airport is the ninth to implement the advanced security measures suggested after the September 11, 2001, attacks. This terminal is able to comply better with security regulations and supports a greater number of flights and passengers.

In 2013 and 2017, the airport extended the east-west runway to accommodate more flights to more locations, possibly to upgrade to an international airport for Air Canada Express flights.

In October 2017, a Costco store opened next to the airport entrance on a property leased to the warehouse chain for 60 years.

The airport saw upgrades to its parking lot and TSA checkpoint in 2022. This allowed for an additional 424 parking spots and a third TSA checkpoint line that can accommodate modern screening technology. The airport also added a hybrid USO location to assist soldiers traveling through.

The airport received $14 million in 2020 as part of the federal CARES act to help it maintain operations and complete upgrades during the covid 19 pandemic.

The airport set passenger records in 2021 and 2022 despite a drop in the number of flights passing through, making it the No 3 airport in Michigan.

The airport was host to campaign events held by gubernatorial candidate Tudor Dixon during the 2022 midterm elections.

At the end of 2023, the airport received a $5 million grant to replace its passenger jetways to modernize the boarding process.

Facilities and aircraft
The Airport has one concourse with six gates.

For the 12-month period ending December 31, 2021, the airport had 101,106 aircraft operations, an average of 277 per day: 75% general aviation, 11% scheduled commercial, 8% air taxi, and 6% military. At that time, there were 125 aircraft based at this airport: 98 single-engine and 15 multi-engine airplanes, 5 helicopter, and 7 jet.

In February 2009, Forbes magazine ranked Cherry Capital Airport second in their list of the top ten "rip-off" airports in the United States, citing an average cost per mile to travelers departing TVC of 41 cents.

The airport has one fixed-base operator, AvFlight.

Ground transportation
The Bay Area Transportation Authority (BATA) serves the airport terminal and links to downtown Traverse City as well as other locations in the surrounding area.

Airlines and destinations

Top domestic destinations

Accidents and incidents
 Northwest Airlink Flight 4712 (operated by Pinnacle Airlines) was a Bombardier CRJ200 from Minneapolis-St. Paul, which overran the runway while landing at TVC during a snowstorm on April 12, 2007. In its Report to Congress, the National Transportation Safety Board wrote that "the aircraft received substantial damage, but the 52 people on board were not injured. The Board determined that the probable cause of this accident was the pilots' decision to land at TVC without performing a landing distance assessment, which was required by company policy. This poor decision-making likely reflected the effects of fatigue produced by a long, demanding duty day, and, for the captain, the duties associated with performing check airman functions. Contributing to the accident were the Federal Aviation Administration pilot flight and duty time regulations that permitted the pilots' long, demanding duty day and the TVC operations supervisor's use of ambiguous and unspecific radio phraseology in providing runway braking information. Four safety recommendations were issued to the FAA addressing timely post-accident drug testing, training on landing distance assessment performance, ground operations personnel communications, and criteria for runway closures in snow and ice conditions. The NTSB adopted the report on June 10, 2008."

References

External links
 
  from Michigan Bureau of Aeronautics
 * 
 Aviation photos: Traverse City - Cherry Capital (Municipal) (TVC / KTVC) from Airliners.net
 Aerial image as of 27 April 1998 from USGS The National Map
 
 

Airports in Michigan
Buildings and structures in Grand Traverse County, Michigan
Transportation in Grand Traverse County, Michigan
Traverse City, Michigan